Samantha Tajik is an Iranian Canadian model, actress and television personality. She was crowned Miss Universe Canada 2008 on 28 April 2008 in Toronto, Ontario, and went on to represent Canada at the Miss Universe 2008 beauty pageant in Vietnam in July of that year. Tajik is the first Iranian-Canadian woman to have won the title of Miss Universe Canada; she has also excelled in the world of modelling, winning the title of International Model of the Year in 2007.

Modelling career

Official titles 

 Miss Universe Canada 2008 – Winner
 Miss Continente Americano 2008 – Winner of Miss Congeniality
 International Model of the Year 2007 – Winner
 Global Beauty Queen 2007 – Second runner-up

References

External links
Miss Universe Canada official website

1983 births
Living people
Female models from Ontario
Iranian emigrants to Canada
Iranian female models
Miss Universe 2008 contestants
Miss Universe Canada winners
Naturalized citizens of Canada
People from Richmond Hill, Ontario
Canadian beauty pageant winners